Scrying, also known by various names such as "seeing" or "peeping", is the practice of looking into a suitable medium in the hope of detecting significant messages or visions. The objective might be personal guidance, prophecy, revelation, or inspiration, but down the ages, scrying in various forms also has been a means of divination or fortune-telling.  It remains popular in occult circles, discussed in many media, both modern and centuries old.

Definitions and terminology
There is no definitive distinction between scrying and other aids to clairvoyance, augury, or divination, but roughly speaking, scrying depends on impressions of visions in the medium of choice. Ideally in this respect it differs from augury, which relies on interpretations of objectively observable objects or events (such as flight of birds); from divination, which depends on standardized processes or rituals; from oneiromancy, which depends on the interpretation of dreams; from the physiological effects of psychoactive drugs; and from clairvoyance, which notionally does not depend on objective sensory stimuli. Clairvoyance in other words, is regarded as amounting in essence to extrasensory perception. 
 
Scrying is neither a single, clearly defined, nor formal discipline and there is no uniformity in the procedures, which repeatedly and independently have been reinvented or elaborated in many ages and regions. Furthermore, practitioners and authors coin terminology so arbitrarily, and often artificially, that no one system of nomenclature can be taken as authoritative and definitive. Commonly terms in use are Latinisations or Hellenisations of descriptions of the media or activities. Examples of names coined for crystal gazing include 'crystallomancy', 'spheromancy', and 'catoptromancy'. As an example of the looseness of such terms, catoptromancy should refer more specifically to scrying by use of mirrors or other reflective objects rather than by crystal gazing. Other names that have been coined for the use of various scrying media include anthracomancy for glowing coals, turifumy for scrying into smoke, and hydromancy for scrying into water. There is no clear limit to the coining and application of such terms and media.

Scrying has been practiced in many cultures in the belief that it can reveal the past, present, or future. Some practitioners assert that visions that come when one stares into the media are from the subconscious or imagination, while others say that they come from gods, spirits, devils, or the psychic mind, depending on the culture and practice. There is neither any systematic body of empirical support for any such views in general however, nor for their respective rival merits; individual preferences in such matters are arbitrary.

Media
The media most commonly used in scrying are reflective, refractive, translucent, or luminescent surfaces or objects such as crystals, stones, or glass in various shapes such as crystal balls, mirrors, reflective black surfaces such as obsidian, water surfaces, fire, or smoke, but there is no special limitation on the preferences or prejudices of the scryer; some may stare into pitch dark, clear sky, clouds, shadows, or light patterns against walls, ceilings, or pond beds. Some prefer glowing coals or shimmering mirages. Some simply close their eyes, notionally staring at the insides of their own eyelids, and speak of "eyelid scrying". 

Scrying media generally either suggest images directly (such as figures in fire, fluid eddies or clouds), or else they distort or reflect the observers' vision confusingly, in the manner to be seen in crystals or transparent balls. Such fancies have long been satirised by sceptics, for example in Hamlet III.ii:
Do you see yonder cloud that's almost in shape of a camel?
By the mass, and 'tis like a camel, indeed.
Methinks it is like a weasel.
It is backed like a weasel.
Or like a whale?
Very like a whale.

Alternatively the medium might reduce visual stimuli to thresholds below which any clear impressions could interfere with fancied visions or free association. Examples include darkened reflections of night sky, or plain shadow or darkness.

Methods 

One class of methods of scrying involves a self-induced trance, with or without the aid of a medium such as a crystal ball or, even via modern technology such as a smartphone among other things. Some say that the sensation is drug-like, some that various drugs can potentiate the experience; others categorically exclude any connection with drug usage, claiming that it invalidates any images observed.

Many practitioners say that the scrying medium initially serves to focus attention, removing unwanted thoughts from the mind in much the same way as repetition of a mantra, concentration on a mandala, inducing the relaxation response, or possibly by hypnosis. Once this stage is achieved, the scryer may begin free association with the perceived images. The technique of deliberately looking for and declaring these initial images aloud, however trivial or irrelevant they may seem to the conscious mind, attempts to deepen the trance state. In this state some scryers hear their own disassociated voices affirming what they see, in a mental feedback loop.

Practitioners apply the process until they achieve a satisfactory state of perception in which rich visual images and dramatic stories seem to be projected within the medium itself, or in the mind's eye of the scryer. They claim that the technique allows them to see relevant events or images within the chosen medium.

Nostradamus practiced scrying; he would stare into a bowl of water or a "magic mirror" to see the future while he was in trance.

Religion and mythology

Hebrew Bible
Divination is briefly mentioned in chapter 44 of the Book of Genesis. A silver chalice or cup is deliberately planted in Benjamin's sack when he leaves Egypt, later to be used as evidence of theft. It is revealed the cup belongs to Joseph, the vizier of Egypt, whose steward claimed was used for drinking and divination during the course of his accusation. This is mentioned to reinforce his disguise as an Egyptian nobleman. Nothing in the book of Genesis indicates that Joseph actually used the cup for divination.

Ancient Persia 

The Shahnameh, a 10th-century epic work narrating historical and mythological past of Persia, gives a description of what was called the Cup of Jamshid (Jaam-e Jam), which was used by the ancient (mythological) Persian kings for observing all of the seven layers of the universe.  The cup was said to contain an elixir of immortality, but without cogent explanation for any relevance of the elixir to the scrying function.

Latter Day Saint movement 

In the late 1820s, Joseph Smith founded the Latter Day Saint movement based in part on what was said to be information obtained miraculously from the reflections of seer stones. Smith had at least three separate stones, including his favorite, a brown stone he found during excavation of a neighbor's well. He initially used these stones in various treasure-digging quests in the early 1820s, placing the stone inside the crown of his hat and putting his face in the hat to read what he believed were the miraculous reflections from the stone. Smith also said that he had access to a separate set of spectacles composed of seer stones, which he called the Urim and Thummim. He said that, through these stones, he could translate the golden plates that are the stated source of the Book of Mormon.

In folklore

Rituals that involve many acts similar to scrying in ceremonial magic are retained in the form of folklore and superstition.  A formerly widespread tradition held that young women gazing into a mirror in a darkened room (often on Halloween) could catch a glimpse of their future husband's face in the mirror — or a skull personifying Death if their fate was to die before they married.

Another form of the tale, involving the same actions of gazing into a mirror in a darkened room, is used as a supernatural dare in the tale of "Bloody Mary".  Here, the motive is usually to test the adolescent gazers' mettle against a malevolent witch or ghost, in a ritual designed to allow the scryers' easy escape if the visions summoned prove too frightening.

Folklore superstitions such as those just mentioned, are not to be distinguished clearly from traditional tales, within which the reality of such media are taken for granted. In the fairytale of Snow White for example, the jealous queen consults a magic mirror, which she asks "Magic mirror on the wall / Who is the fairest of them all?", to which the mirror always replies "You, my queen, are fairest of all." But when Snow White reaches the age of seven, she becomes as beautiful as the day, and when the queen asks her mirror, it responds: "Queen, you are full fair, 'tis true, but Snow White is fairer than you." There is no uniformity among believers, in how seriously they prefer to take such tales and superstitions.

Scientific reception

Scrying is not supported by science as a method of predicting the future or obtaining information unavailable to empirical investigation. Some critics consider it to be a pseudoscience. Skeptics consider scrying to be the result of delusion or wishful thinking.

Psychologist Leonard Zusne suggested that scrying images are hallucinations or hypnagogic experiences.

A 2010 paper in the journal Perception identified one specific method of reliably reproducing a scrying illusion in a mirror and hypothesized that it "might be caused by low level fluctuations in the stability of edges, shading and outlines affecting the perceived definition of the face, which gets over-interpreted as ‘someone else’ by the face recognition system."

Related modern traditions 

The Hermetic Order of the Golden Dawn (1888-c.1902 in its original form) taught their own version of scrying that could be done individually or as a group. It emphasized three levels:
"Scrying in the Spirit Vision" with an emphasis on inner seeing by focusing on a symbol or mirror, 
"Traveling in the Spirit Vision" involves going to the place seen and  interacting with what is found there,
"Rising on the Planes" focuses on a spiritual process (involving scrying via the Tree of Life) that has the potential to elevate consciousness to the level of the Divine.

See also

Chinese magic mirror
John Dee
Ganzfeld experiment
Kozyrev mirror
Lecanomancy
Macharomancy
Magic (paranormal)
Melong
Psychomanteum
Remote viewing
Renaissance magic
Scyphomancy
Sensory deprivation
Time viewer
Yard globe

References
  Some content in this article was copied from Glass candle at A Wiki of Ice and Fire, which is licensed under the Creative Commons Attribution-Share Alike 3.0 (Unported) (CC-BY-SA 3.0) license.

Further reading

 Theodore Besterman. (1924). Crystal Gazing: Study in the History, Distribution, Theory and Practice of Scrying. London: Rider. 
 Aleister Crowley, Adrian Axwirthy. (2001). A Symbolic Representation of the Universe: Derived by Doctor John Dee Through the Scrying of Sir Edward Kelly. Holmes Publishing Group.
 Andrew Lang. (1900). Crystal Visions, Savage and Civilised. In The Making of Religion. London: Longmans. pp. 83–104.
 Northcote Whitridge Thomas. (1905). Crystal Gazing: Its History and Practice with a Discussion on the Evidence for Telepathic Scrying. Moring.
 Donald Tyson. (1997). Scrying for Beginners: Tapping into the Supersensory Powers of Your Subconscious. Llewellyn Publications.
 Richard Wiseman. (2011). Paranormality: Why We See What Isn't There. Macmillan.

External links
Scrying - Skeptic's Dictionary

Divination
Pseudoscience